Ice sledge speed racing at the 1994 Winter Paralympics consisted of eight events, four for men and four for women.

Seven countries (Norway, Austria, Canada, Estonia, Iceland, Japan and the Netherlands) took part and Norway pulled off an almost complete clean sweep of the medals, winning all eight gold medals, all eight silver, and seven of the eight bronze - with the sole other going to Austria.

Medal summary

Men's events

Women's events

References 

 

1994 Winter Paralympics events
1994